Corymbia polysciada, commonly known as the apple gum, paper-fruited bloodwood or bolomin, is a species of tree that is endemic to the Top End of the Northern Territory. It has rough, tessellated bark on some or all or the trunk, smooth bark above, egg-shaped to broadly lance-shaped adult leaves, flower buds in groups of seven, creamy white flowers and cup-shaped, cylindrical or barrel-shaped from on long pedicels.

Description
It has rough, tessellated dark gray bark on some, rarely all of the trunk, smooth creamy white bark above that is shed in thin scales. The tree is usually leafless by the middle of the dry season. Flowering occurs from June to November and the flowers are creamy white.

Taxonomy and naming
This bloodwood was first formally described in 1859 by Ferdinand von Mueller who gave it the name Eucalyptus polysciada and published the description in the Journal of the Proceedings of the Linnean Society, Botany. In 1995 Ken Hill and Lawrence Alexander Sidney Johnson changed the name to Corymbia polysciada. The Wagiman peoples know the tree as bolomin.

Distribution and habitat
Corymbia polysciada is widespread and common in the wetter woodlands of the Northern Territory north from near Mataranka, where it grows on stony ridges and on gravelly plains.

See also
 List of Corymbia species

References

polysciada
Myrtales of Australia
Flora of the Northern Territory
Plants described in 1859
Taxa named by Ferdinand von Mueller